Zarrentin am Schaalsee, until 2004 simply Zarrentin, is a town in the Ludwigslust-Parchim district, in Mecklenburg-Western Pomerania, Germany. It is situated on the Schaalsee lake, 19 km southeast of Ratzeburg, and 34 km west of Schwerin.

History
In the 11th century, the Slavic settlement of Zarnethin was at Zarrentin. It could translate vaguely to "place of evil" or "black site", indicating a former ritual place. In 1139/1143 the place was reigned by Henry of Badewide, a Saxon count. From the late 12th century on, many Germans settled here. The Ratzeburger Zehntregister mentions the place in 1230.

The Zarrentin Abbey was founded in 1246 and dissolved in 1552. Parts of the building remain until today. When the town was connected to train tracks in 1896 via the Hagenow Land–Bad Oldesloe railway, it grew larger and became home to various factories (for barrels, potato fabrication, a lime kiln), and construction entrepreneurs, corn and cattle dealers settled. 1938, when Zarrentin already grew to a population of 2000, it received town privileges. Since then, it also became popular with tourists for the surrounding nature and the renowned hospitality.

Between 1982 and 1990 Zarrentin served as East German inner German border crossing for cars travelling along today's Bundesautobahn 24 between the East German Democratic Republic, or West Berlin and the West German Federal Republic of Germany. The traffic was subject to the interzonal traffic regulations, that between West Germany and West Berlin followed the special regulations of the Transit Agreement (1972).

References

Inner German border
Cities and towns in Mecklenburg
Ludwigslust-Parchim
Populated places established in 1938
Grand Duchy of Mecklenburg-Schwerin